Asitha Madusanka Fernando (born 31 July 1997) is a professional Sri Lankan cricketer. He made his international debut for the Sri Lanka cricket team in July 2017.

Under 19 and domestic career
Prior to his Test selection, he was part of Sri Lanka's squad for the 2016 Under-19 Cricket World Cup. He was the leading pace bowler in the World Cup for Sri Lanka who finished the tournament as semi-finalists courtesy of bowling performances of Fernando and Lahiru Kumara.

He made his Twenty20 debut for Chilaw Marians Cricket Club in the 2017–18 SLC Twenty20 Tournament on 24 February 2018.

In March 2018, he was named in Dumbulla's squad for the 2017–18 Super Four Provincial Tournament. The following month, he was also named in Dambulla's squad for the 2018 Super Provincial One Day Tournament. He was the leading wicket-taker for Dambulla in the tournament, with six dismissals in three matches.

In August 2018, he was named in Colombo's squad the 2018 SLC T20 League. In March 2019, he was named in Colombo's squad for the 2019 Super Provincial One Day Tournament.

In January 2020, in the 2019–20 SLC Twenty20 Tournament, he took six wickets for eight runs for Chilaw Marians Cricket Club. In October 2020, he was drafted by the Galle Gladiators for the inaugural edition of the Lanka Premier League. In August 2021, he was named in the SLC Reds team for the 2021 SLC Invitational T20 League tournament.

International career
In July 2016 he was named in Sri Lanka's Test squad for their series against Australia, but he did not play.

Fernando was included in Sri Lanka's One Day International (ODI) squad for the series against Zimbabwe. He made his ODI debut on 8 July 2017 at the Mahinda Rajapaksa International Cricket Stadium in the fourth ODI against Zimbabwe, but did not able to take a wicket.

In February 2018, he was named in Sri Lanka's Twenty20 International (T20I) squad for their series against Bangladesh, but he did not play. In May 2018, he was named in Sri Lanka's Test squad for their series against the West Indies.

In December 2018, he was named in Sri Lanka team for the 2018 ACC Emerging Teams Asia Cup. In August 2019, he was named in a twenty-two man squad for Sri Lanka's Test series against New Zealand. However, he was not named in the final fifteen-man squad for the first Test. In November 2019, he was named in Sri Lanka's squad for the 2019 ACC Emerging Teams Asia Cup in Bangladesh. Later the same month, he was named in Sri Lanka's squad for the cricket tournament at the 2019 South Asian Games. The Sri Lanka team won the silver medal, after they lost to Bangladesh by seven wickets in the final.

In December 2019, he was added to Sri Lanka's Test squad for their tour to Sri Lankan cricket team in Pakistan in 2019–20. He replaced Suranga Lakmal, who was ruled out of the tour due to dengue fever. In March 2020, he was added to Sri Lanka's Twenty20 International (T20I) squad for the series against the West Indies, replacing Nuwan Pradeep.

In December 2020, Fernando was named in Sri Lanka's Test squad for their series against South Africa. He made his Test debut for Sri Lanka, against South Africa, on 3 January 2021. In February 2021, Fernando was named in Sri Lanka's T20I squad for their series against the West Indies. In July 2021, he was named in Sri Lanka's squad for their series against India.

In May 2022, in the second match of the series against Bangladesh, Fernando took his first five-wicket haul in Test cricket, with 6/51. In August 2022, he was named in Sri Lanka's T20I squad for the 2022 Asia Cup. He made his T20I debut on 1 September 2022, against Bangladesh.

References

External links
 

1997 births
Living people
Sri Lankan cricketers
Sri Lanka Test cricketers
Sri Lanka One Day International cricketers
Sri Lanka Twenty20 International cricketers
Chilaw Marians Cricket Club cricketers
Puttalam District cricketers
South Asian Games silver medalists for Sri Lanka
South Asian Games medalists in cricket
Galle Gladiators cricketers